A prospective payment system (PPS) is a term used to refer to several payment methodologies for which means of determining insurance reimbursement is based on a predetermined payment regardless of the intensity of the actual service provided.

It includes a system for paying hospitals based on predetermined prices, from Medicare. Payments are typically based on codes provided on the insurance claim such as these:

 Diagnosis-related groups for hospital inpatient claims
 Ambulatory Payment Classification for hospital outpatient claims
 Current Procedural Terminology for other outpatient claims

The PPS was established by the Centers for Medicare and Medicaid Services (CMS), as a result of the Social Security Amendments Act of 1983, specifically to address expensive hospital care. Regardless of services provided, payment was of an established fee. The idea was to encourage hospitals to lower their prices for expensive hospital care. 

In 2000, CMS changed the reimbursement system for outpatient care at Federally Qualified Health Centers (FQHCs) to include a prospective payment system for Medicaid and Medicare.  Under this system, health centers receive a fixed, per-visit payment for any visit by a patient with Medicaid, regardless of the length or intensity of the visit. The per-visit rate for the Medicaid PPS is specific to the individual health center location. The rate is determined and updated by a financial accounting process conducted by State Medicaid agencies. The FQHC PPS rate for Medicare (previously called the All Inclusive Reimbursement Rate), in contrast, is fixed at the same level across different health centers.   

Aside from FQHCs, other entities that provide outpatient services to Medicaid patients, that are also paid by a PPS methodology include:
FQHC look-alikes (health centers not receiving a federal grant under section 330 of the Public Health Service Act, but that otherwise meet the criteria for FQHC status.)
Indian Health Service Health Centers
Rural Health Centers (in some states, like California)

See also 
 Medicare Payment Advisory Commission (MedPAC)
 Accountable care organization
 Medical classification
 Community health centers in the United States

References 

Medicare and Medicaid (United States)
Healthcare in the United States